Engyum is a genus of beetles in the family Cerambycidae, containing the following species:

 Engyum aurantium Martins, 1970
 Engyum carinatum Martins, 1970
 Engyum crassum Martins, 1970
 Engyum euchare (Martins, 1960)
 Engyum fasciatum Martins, 2009
 Engyum fusiferum (Audinet-Serville, 1834)
 Engyum howdeni Martins & Napp, 1986
 Engyum linsleyi Martins, 1970
 Engyum ludibriosum Martins, 1970
 Engyum melanodacrys (White, 1855)
 Engyum oculare Martins, 2009
 Engyum quadrinotatum Thomson, 1864
 Engyum transversum Martins, 1970
 Engyum virgulatum (Bates, 1880)
 Engyum zonarium Martins & Napp, 1986

References

Ibidionini